The University of Florida College of Veterinary Medicine is the veterinary school of the University of Florida in Gainesville, Florida.  The college only enrolls professional program D.V.M. students and graduate students pursuing M.S. or Ph.D. degrees. No undergraduates are enrolled in the college.

Founded in 1976, it is one of six academic colleges and schools that compose the university's Academic Health Center.  The college is located on the university's Gainesville, Florida campus.

In FY 2021, the college generated $43.1 million from state funding and tuition, $22.8 million in research awards; $40.8 million from clinical services, $5.2 million from foundation/philanthropic gifts and $8.9 million in other funding.

Academics
The College of Veterinary Medicine offers the Doctor of Veterinary Medicine degree on campus. As of 2021, the current DVM enrollment includes 455 students. Fifty one students attend the college on campus for the graduate programs for their masters or Doctor of Philosophy degrees.  465 students are enrolled in the college's online masters program.

Organization
The college is organized into these units: 
 College Administration
 Department of Large Animal Clinical Sciences (LACS)
 Department of Infectious Diseases and Pathology
 Department of Physiological Sciences
 Department of Small Animal Clinical Sciences (SACS)
 Department of Comparative, Diagnostic, and Population Medicine (CDPM)
  UF Veterinary Hospitals

Animal hospitals
The UF Veterinary Hospitals include the UF Small Animal Hospital and the UF Large Animal Hospital in Gainesville, and UF Pet Emergency Treatment Services (PETS) and UF Veterinary Hospital at World Equestrian Center (opening spring 2022) in Ocala. The UF Veterinary Hospitals are a major animal referral center in the Southeast. An estimated 44,000 animals are seen and treated each year at the UF Veterinary Hospitals and through field visits.

Ranking
In the 2019 U.S. News & World Report rankings, the college ranked 9th overall amongst all veterinary medicine colleges.

Facility images

See also
 University of Florida College of Dentistry
 University of Florida College of Medicine
 University of Florida College of Nursing
 University of Florida College of Pharmacy
 University of Florida College of Public Health and Health Professions

References

External links
Official website
UF Health
Online courses in Aquatic Animal Health from UF CVM
 Online courses from the Maddie's Shelter Medicine Program
Gainesville Sun info about the College
About the Clinical Services they provide
Capital Campaign info for the College
Gainesville Sun Article about the College
Gainesville Sun article about the new Animal Hospital

Veterinary Medicine
Educational institutions established in 1976
Veterinary schools in the United States
1976 establishments in Florida